The Dangerous Drugs (Supply to Addicts) Regulations 1968  determined the consultants who could prescribe, or treat addicts either in psychiatric hospitals or drug dependency units. Other medical staff, if supervised by the consultants within the hospitals, would also be able to obtain licences. Doctors working outside the NHS would be considered if their organisations had similar facilities to the DDUs.
Doctors who disobeyed these regulations might have their permissions to supply rescinded. In fact only the treatment centers were allowed to supply.

References 

Drug control law in the United Kingdom
English criminal law
Substance dependence
Statutory Instruments of the United Kingdom
1968 in British law